Kileh (also Romanized as Kīleh) is a village in Kuhdasht-e Jonubi Rural District, in the Central District of Kuhdasht County, Lorestan Province, Iran. At the 2006 census, its population was 878, in 165 families.

References 

Towns and villages in Kuhdasht County